Holiday From You is the second major label release by the Milwaukee-based rock band The Gufs. The album peaked at #33 on the Billboard magazine Top Heatseekers chart. Holiday From You was re-released on Red Submarine Records, with some alternate tracks and revamped artwork, in 2006. The track "Give Back Yourself" features vocals by Rob Thomas. The 2006 reissued version features the Don Gilmore remixes of "Last Goodbye" and "Give Back Yourself".

Track listing
All tracks by The Gufs

"Last Goodbye" – 3:52
"Surrounded" – 3:25
"Happily Ever After" – 4:08
"Lake 17" – 3:19
"Dumb" – 4:21
"Stuck" – 3:22
"Give Back Yourself" – 4:24
"Somewhere Out There" – 4:06
"Mistake" – 4:21
"Dead & Gone" – 3:21
"All I Want To Be" – 5:02
"Ashes" – 6:47
Re-Issue Bonus Track 
"Forever Fallin" – 4:05

Personnel 

 Goran Kralj – lead vocals, guitar
 Dejan Kralj – bass guitar
 Morgan Dawley – lead guitar, backup vocals
 Scott Schwebel – drums, percussion

External links
The Gufs Official Website

Notes

1990 albums
The Gufs albums
Albums produced by Arnold Lanni